The Sape Strait or Sapie Strait is a strait connecting the Flores Sea to the Sumba Strait.  It separates the islands of Sumbawa and Komodo.  It joins the Indonesian provinces of West Nusa Tenggara and East Nusa Tenggara.

The Sape Strait is known for rough seas, shoals and strong currents, as well as spectacular marine life. The waters of the strait are enjoying growing popularity among diving enthusiasts. 

Part of the Sape water area is included in the Komodo National Park, a UNESCO World Heritage Site. 

The volcanic islands in the Strait include:
Sangeang, Banta Island, Matagate Island (administratively part of Sumbawa Regency)
Komodo Island, Rinca Island (administratively part of East Flores Regency)

Notes 

Straits of Indonesia
Landforms of West Nusa Tenggara
Landforms of East Nusa Tenggara
Lesser Sunda Islands